San José Municipality may refer to:
 San José, Caldas, Colombia
 San José, El Petén, Honduras
 San José Municipality, Santa Cruz, Bolivia

Municipality name disambiguation pages